Erethistes maesotensis is a species of South Asian river catfish native to Myanmar and Thailand where it is known from Moei River near Mae Sot on the Thai-Burmese border.  E. maesotensis has been observed to inhabit fast-moving waters; during the rainy season, the water depth can increase by at least 3 metres (10 ft). The substrate mainly consists of small stones and sand with numerous empty gastropod shells.  This species grows to a length of  SL.

References 
 

Erethistidae
Fish of Asia
Fish of Thailand
Taxa named by Maurice Kottelat
Fish described in 1983